Geoffrey Laurence Curran (born October 20, 1995) is an American former professional cyclist, who rode for the  team between 2014 and 2017.

Major results

2012
 1st  Overall International 3-Etappen-Rundfahrt Junioren
1st Young rider classification
1st Stage 1 (ITT)
 3rd Overall Tour de l'Abitibi
1st Young rider classification
 4th Overall Grand Prix Rüebliland
1st Stage 4
2013
 1st  Overall Tour du Pays de Vaud
1st Stage 2a
 2nd Overall Trofeo Karlsberg
 7th Overall Tour de l'Abitibi
2014
 1st Young rider classification Le Triptyque des Monts et Châteaux
2015
 3rd Giro del Belvedere
2016
 National Under-23 Road Championships
1st  Road race
1st  Time trial
 7th Time trial, UCI Under-23 Road World Championships
 9th Overall Olympia's Tour
1st Stage 1 (TTT)
 9th GP Capodarco
2017
 6th Overall Tour de Beauce

References

External links

1995 births
Living people
American male cyclists
People from Tustin, California
21st-century American people